The 1991–92 Duke Blue Devils men's basketball team was a Division I college basketball team that competed in the Atlantic Coast Conference. Led by All-American Christian Laettner and Grant Hill, Duke won its 2nd national championship in as many years to become the first repeating team since UCLA's seven-year dynasty from 1967 to 1973. The feat would not be accomplished again in college basketball until the Florida Gators did it in 2007.

Roster

Expectations
The Blue Devils started the season as the defending National Champions, and were looking to repeat as National Champions for the first time since UCLA did it in 1973. Losing only Greg Koubek to graduation, Duke retained its core players including Laettner, Bobby Hurley, and Grant Hill and was able to add recruits Cherokee Parks and Erik Meek to its lineup.

Regular season
The Blue Devils started the season ranked No. 1 and won its first 17 games. Their unbeaten streak came to an end when they lost a close contest to North Carolina in the Dean Dome by a score of 75–73. However, Duke would only lose another game (to Wake Forest 72–68) for the rest of the season and finished the season with a 25–2 record and the 10th regular-season championship in school history.

Conference Tournament
Duke entered the ACC tournament as the No. 1 seed. They defeated North Carolina in the ACC title game 94–74 to capture their 9th ACC Tournament Championship in school history. As a result, the Blue Devils received a No. 1 seed in the East Regional of the NCAA tournament.

NCAA tournament
The Blue Devils had little trouble progressing through the first three rounds, but faced the toughest test of the season in the East Regional Final against sixth-ranked and No. 2 seed Kentucky coached by Rick Pitino. In perhaps the greatest college basketball game in history, Christian Laettner hit a buzzer-beating turnaround jumper on a long inbounds pass from Grant Hill, and Duke got a 104–103 overtime win over Kentucky to earn its fifth straight Final Four appearance. Laettner scored 31 points in that game, making all 10 of his field goal attempts (including a three-pointer) and all 10 of his free throws.

After defeating an Indiana team led by Calbert Cheaney, Duke reached the title game for the third consecutive time to face off against Michigan's Fab Five, led by freshmen Chris Webber, Jalen Rose, Juwan Howard, Jimmy King and Ray Jackson. The Blue Devils ended the Fab Five's dream run in a 71–51 contest to become the first team since UCLA 19 years ago to repeat as National Champions. Bobby Hurley was named NCAA basketball tournament Most Outstanding Player.

Schedule

|-
!colspan=9 style=| Regular season

|-
!colspan=8 style=| ACC Tournament

|-
!colspan=9 style=| NCAA tournament

Rankings

Accomplishments
2nd straight national championship (1991–1992)
3rd straight appearance in national championship game (1990–1992)
5th straight appearance in Final Four (1988–1992)
Held AP No. 1 ranking from start to finish throughout season (18 polls)
Christian Laettner received several Player of the Year accolades in 1992:
NABC Player of the Year
AP National Player of the Year
Oscar Robertson Trophy
Wooden Award
Naismith Award
Adolph Rupp Trophy
Christian Laettner was a unanimous First Team All-American selection.
Christian Laettner became the only player to start in four consecutive Final Fours. He also played in a record-setting 23 games in the NCAA Tournament. (To break this record, one would have to play in four consecutive championship games.)
Four players received All-ACC honors:
Christian Laettner (1st Team)
Grant Hill, Bobby Hurley (2nd Team)
Thomas Hill (3rd Team)
Three players from the 1992 squad (Laettner, Hurley, and Grant Hill) had their jerseys retired by Duke.
Mike Krzyzewski was named the Naismith College Coach of the Year

References

External links
Duke Blue Devils Basketball Statistical Database

 

Duke Blue Devils men's basketball seasons
Duke Blue Devils
NCAA Division I men's basketball tournament championship seasons
NCAA Division I men's basketball tournament Final Four seasons
Duke
Duke
Duke